David Vranković (born 11 November 1993) is an Australian association football player who currently plays as a centre back for Bonnyrigg White Eagles F.C.

Club career
On 5 October 2012 David made his professional debut for Melbourne Heart coming off the bench in a match against rival Melbourne Victory. On 12 January 2015 he was the fourth foreign player to be signed by Becamex Binh Duong for the Asian Football Confederation Champions League.

References

1993 births
Living people
Soccer players from Sydney
Association football defenders
Bonnyrigg White Eagles FC players
Sydney FC players
Melbourne City FC players
Australian people of Serbian descent
Marconi Stallions FC players
Australian expatriate soccer players
Expatriate footballers in Vietnam
V.League 1 players
National Premier Leagues players
A-League Men players
Australian soccer players